Huseyin Hasan Zeybek (born on March 11, 1968, in Xanthi) is a politician from the Muslim minority of Western Thrace in northeastern Greece.

He has been elected to the Greek Parliament for Coalition of the Radical Left (SYRIZA) in May 2012, and was re-elected in June 2012, January and September 2015. He was nominated by SYRIZA in the 2009 parliamentary elections in the Xanthi Prefecture, and was a candidate for the post of deputy regional governor in the local government elections of 2010. He is vice-president of the association of Pharmacists of Xanthi, and has served as president of the school board of the 1st Minority Primary School in Xanthi.

Ηe is a graduate of the School of Pharmacy of the Gazi University in Ankara, and since 2003 he works as a pharmacist in Xanthi.

External links 
 

1968 births
Living people
People from Xanthi
Greek pharmacists
Gazi University alumni
Greek people of Turkish descent
Coalition of Left, of Movements and Ecology politicians
Syriza politicians
Greek MPs 2012 (May)
Greek MPs 2012–2014
Greek MPs 2015 (February–August)
Greek MPs 2015–2019
Greek MPs 2019–2023